Asif Bashir Bhagat  was born in Village Bhagat, Tehsil Phalia, located in Mandi Bahauddin. His father a local politician and was elected in Musharaf's Government.   He has been elected as Member Provincial Assembly of the Punjab in general elections 2008 against PML-N leader Pir Syed Tariq Yaqoob Rizvi and PML-Q's Leader Basma Riaz Choudhry from the Constituency PP-117 (Mandi Bahuddin-II) and is functioning as Chairman, Standing Committee on Sports.

References

 
 
 
Asif Bashir Bhagat Personality & Bio Data

Phalia
Living people
Year of birth missing (living people)